Tamiya may refer to:

Tamiya Corporation, a Japanese manufacturer of plastic model kits, radio-controlled cars and related products
Tamiya-ryū (disambiguation), several iaijutsu ryūgi
Tamiya connector, a type of DC power connector

Places
Tamiya, Egypt, a town in Egypt

People with the surname
Hiroshi Tamiya (1903–1984), Japanese botanist
Kenjiro Tamiya (1928 - 2010), Japanese baseball player
Tomoe Tamiyasu aka Tomoe Tamiya, Japanese voice actress

Fictional characters
Toraichi Tamiya, a character from Ah! Megami-sama

Japanese-language surnames